The 1949–50 Sussex County Football League season was the 25th in the history of the competition.

League table
The league featured 14 clubs, 13 which competed in the last season, along with one new club:
 Arundel
Bognor Regis added Town to the club name.

League table

References

1949-50
9